Lithophane leeae is a moth of the family Noctuidae. It is only found in the Chiricahua Mountains in southeastern Arizona.

References 

leeae
Chiricahua Mountains